Scheloribatidae is a family of mites and ticks in the order Sarcoptiformes. There are at least 20 genera and 320 described species in Scheloribatidae.

Genera

References

Further reading

 
 
 
 

Acariformes
Acari families